A general election was in the U.S. state of Oklahoma on November 4, 2014. All of Oklahoma's executive officers were up for election as well as the state's five seats in the United States House of Representatives and both of the states United States Senate seats. Primary elections were held on June 24, 2014, and primary runoffs were held on August 26, 2014.

Governor

Incumbent Republican Governor Mary Fallin ran for re-election to a second term in office. She was challenged in the primary by Dax Ewbank and attorney Chad Moody.

State Representative Joe Dorman ran as a Democrat and Independents Richard Prawdzienski, the former Chair of the Libertarian Party of Oklahoma and candidate for Lieutenant Governor of Oklahoma in 2010 and Kimberly Willis also ran.

Lieutenant Governor
In Oklahoma, the Governor and Lieutenant Governor are elected separately. Incumbent Republican Lieutenant Governor Todd Lamb ran for re-election to a second term in office. He ran against Democratic businesswoman Cathy Cummings.

Attorney General
Incumbent Republican Attorney General Scott Pruitt ran unopposed for re-election to a second term in office.

Treasurer
Incumbent Republican State Treasurer Ken A. Miller ran unopposed for re-election to a second term in office.

State Auditor and Inspector
Incumbent Republican State Auditor and Inspector Gary Jones ran unopposed for re-election to a second term in office.

Superintendent of Public Instruction
Incumbent Republican Superintendent of Public Instruction Janet Barresi ran for re-election to a second term in office.

Republican primary

Candidates
Barresi's first term was seen as controversial and she was challenged in the Republican primary by businesswoman, former public school teacher and former State Board of Education member Joy Hofmeister and educator and candidate for Superintendent in 2010 Brian S. Kelly.

Polling

Results

Democratic primary

Candidates
Four Democrats ran in the primary: Superintendent of Peggs School District in Cherokee County John Cox, founder of the ASTEC Charter Schools System Freda Deskin, Government Relations Director for Professional Oklahoma Educators and former Assistant State Superintendent for Financial Services at the Oklahoma State Department of Education Jack Herron, and retired college professor, former Chairman of the Oklahoma Democratic Party and former Oklahoma State Department of Education employee Ivan Holmes. Bennington Schools Superintendent Donna Anderson had been running, but withdrew from the race.

Polling

Results

Runoff

General election

Polling

Results

Commissioner of Insurance
Incumbent Republican Insurance Commissioner John D. Doak ran for re-election to a second term in office.

He was challenged in the Republican primary by Bill Viner. No other candidate filed to run.

Commissioner of Labor
Incumbent Republican Labor Commissioner Mark Costello ran for re-election to a second term in office.

Mike Workman was the Democratic candidate.

Corporation Commissioner
One of the three seats on the Oklahoma Corporation Commission was up for election. Incumbent Republican Commissioner Patrice Douglas, the Chairman of the Commission, did not run for re-election to a first full term in office. She is instead running for Oklahoma's 5th congressional district.

State Senator Cliff Branan and former Speaker of the Oklahoma House of Representatives and nominee for Lieutenant Governor in 2006 Todd Hiett ran for the Republican nomination. No other candidate filed to run.

United States Senate
Regularly-scheduled election

Incumbent Republican Senator Jim Inhofe ran for re-election to a fourth term in office. He was challenged in the Republican primary by D. Jean McBride-Samuels, retired air traffic controller Rob Moye, perennial candidate Evelyn Rogers and Iraq War veteran Erick Wyatt.

Insurance agency owner Matt Silverstein ran for the Democrats and Independents Aaron DeLozier, Joan Farr and Ray Woods also ran.

Special election

Incumbent Republican Senator Tom Coburn announced his intention to resign on 113th Congress on January 3, 2015, four years into his second six-year term. Thus, a special election was held to fill his seat for the remaining two years of his term.

For the Republicans, former State Senator and candidate for Governor in 2010 Randy Brogdon, Army veteran and sales professional Andy Craig, college professor Kevin Crow, U.S. Representative James Lankford, businessman Eric McCray, State Representative and former Speaker of the Oklahoma House of Representatives T.W. Shannon and paramedic Jason Weger ran.

Patrick Hayes, State Senator Constance N. Johnson and perennial candidate Jim Rogers ran for the Democratic nomination. Independent Mark Beard also ran.

United States House of Representatives

Oklahoma's five seats in the United States House of Representatives were up for election in 2014.

References

 
Oklahoma